Paul Vathis (October 18, 1925 – December 10, 2002) was an American photojournalist. He was a photographer for the Associated Press for 56 years.

Life
He was one of eight children of Greek immigrant parents in Mauch Chunk, Pennsylvania.
He got his start in World War II.  He was a World War II Marine combat veteran, where he shot bomb damage pictures of South Pacific island caves.  Before the war he had never even held a camera before.  He was married to Barbara Vathis and had three children Victoria, Randy, and Stephanie.  He died at age 77 in his home.

Career

He joined the AP in Philadelphia, in 1946; he spent most of his career at the Harrisburg, Pennsylvania bureau of the AP, starting in 1952.

In 1962, he took a picture of President John F. Kennedy and former President Dwight Eisenhower walking together at Camp David.
He covered such events as Wilt Chamberlain's 100-point basketball game in 1962, where he originally was just taking his son Randy to see a game, and the Budd Dwyer suicide in 1987 at the Harrisburg capitol building.
In 1979, he helped cover the nation's worst nuclear power accident at Three Mile Island.
 He died in 2002 in Mechanicsburg, Pennsylvania.

Awards
 1962 Pulitzer Prize for Photography

References

1925 births
2002 deaths
Pulitzer Prize for Photography winners
American photojournalists
United States Marine Corps personnel of World War II
People from Mechanicsburg, Pennsylvania
American writers of Greek descent